Belousovka is a rural locality (a selo) in Lebyazhyevsky Selsoviet of Seryshevsky District, Amur Oblast, Russia. The population was 41 as of 2018. There are three streets.

Geography 
Belousovka is located on the Tom River, 28 km southwest of Seryshevo (the district's administrative centre) by road. Lebyazhye is the nearest rural locality.

References 

Rural localities in Seryshevsky District